William Robson was an English footballer who played as centre forward for Crewe Alexandra in the Football League in 1895.

References

Crewe Alexandra F.C. players
English Football League players
Year of death missing
Year of birth missing
English footballers
Association football forwards